The Jim Reeves Way is a studio album by Jim Reeves, released posthumously in 1965 on RCA Victor. It was produced by Chet Atkins and Bob Ferguson.

The album included 12 tracks, among which "Make the World Go Away" and "Maureen".

The album opens with a cover of Hank Cochran's song "Make the World Go Away", recorded by Reeves at his last recording session in July 1964.

"I Can't Stop Loving You" is another song from that session and is in fact the last song Reeves ever recorded:
When the session ended with some time remaining on the schedule, Reeves suggested that he should record one more song. And he taped "I Can't Stop Loving You".

Track listing

Charts

Awards and nominations

Notes

References 

1965 albums
Jim Reeves albums
RCA Victor albums
Albums produced by Chet Atkins
Albums produced by Bob Ferguson (musician)